Dongyin Township (Tungyin) (Foochow Romanized: Dĕ̤ng-īng-hiŏng) is an insular rural township which is part of Lienchiang County (the Matsu Islands), Fujian Province, Republic of China (Taiwan). The islands are in the East China Sea off the coast of Fujian Province, China near the cities of Fuzhou (Foochow) and Ningde. The township is known for its natural environment and Eastern Min culture, for the historical Dongyong Lighthouse and for its military importance and history as the northernmost territory of the Republic of China (Taiwan).

Name

Dongyin Township is named after Dongyin Island (Tungyin Island), the main island of the township. The Wade-Giles derived English language names for Dongyin derived from the name '' are Tungyin and Tung-yin.

Dongyin Island (Tungyin Island) (Foochow Romanized: Dĕ̤ng-īng-dō̤) was originally called Tungyung Island / Tung Yung / Tung-yung (Dongyong).

The second largest island is Xiyin (Siyin Island, Hsiyin).

In between the two main islands is the small Zhongzhu Island. The three islands have been linked by a causeway since 1986. Beigu Reef is north of Xiyin Island and Shuangzijiao is south of Dongyin Island. A larger island (Pratas Island) in the South China Sea with the same Chinese character name is administered by Cijin District, Kaohsiung, Taiwan.

History

In 1579–80, wokou pirates attacked Dongyin (Tung-yung).

Qing Dynasty
In 1843, there was a large village and fishing establishment on the western side of Dongyin (Tung Yung).

On the morning of April 24, 1901, the Peninsular and Oriental Line steamship SS Sobraon ran ashore in heavy fog and was stranded at Dongyin Island (Tungyung Island). The ship was later abandoned and sunk.

In 1902, it was decided to build a lighthouse on Dongyin Island (Tungyung Island), financed by the British government.

The Dongyong Lighthouse was built in 1904. The lighthouse began operating on May 18, 1904.

Republic of China
The lighthouse was repaired in 1913.

In 1916, due to sudden shifts in wind, two hundred fishing ships were damaged. A few people were killed and injured.

In 1931, the roofs of all the buildings were blown off in extreme winds.

On the night of November 11, 1931, HMS Petersfield ran ashore on the northern side of Dongyin (Tungyung) with Admiral Howard Kelly, Commander-in-Chief, China aboard.

From 1939 to 1950, opium poppy planting and the manufacture and sale of opium was an economic mainstay for the islanders.

In the wake of the surrender of Japan in Autumn 1945, representatives of Siapu County, Changlo County and Lienchiang County visited Dongyin (Tungyung) and contested control of the islands between their counties. The provincial government determined that Dongyin (Tungyung) was part of Lienchiang County.

On February 19, 1955, Nationalist planes mistakenly bombed the island, causing the death of an elderly woman and some property damage.

On July 16, 1956, the township was assigned to Lienchiang County.

In 1958, the lighthouse temporarily stopped operation due to military concerns.

On May 7, 1963, President Chiang Kai-shek visited the township.

On the morning of May 1, 1965, the Battle of Dong-Yin occurred in the waters north of the township.

On April 13 and August 22, 1979, and May 2, July 18, and September 29, 1980, President Chiang Ching-kuo visited the township.

Construction of the Dongyong Reservoir began in 1982 and was completed in 1985.

On May 21, 1985, an attempt by Chinese Communist forces to collect information about Dongyin (Tungyin) by using the hijacked Taiwanese boat Hungchi No 1 was stopped.

On September 19, 1988, and August 10, 1990, President Lee Teng-hui visited the township.

In 1989, the lighthouse resumed operation.

On August 9, 2005, and February 5, 2008, President Chen Shui-bian visited the township.

On June 19, 2010, President Ma Ying-jeou visited the township.

On June 24, 2014, the wreckage of the SS Sobraon was found.

In late April 2019, representatives from the Dongyin Township government visited nearby Haidao Township (PRC).

On December 9, 2020, a ceremony was held marking the beginning of the rebuilding of the township government office and parking area.

Geography

The east coast of Shi Wei Mountain on Dongyin is the easternmost of the Matsu Islands (26。 23’ 08’’N, 120。 30’ 08’’ E), while the north coast of Beigu Reef (北固礁) on Xiyin (Siyin) is the northernmost of the Matsu Islands. Dongyin itself is the northernmost point of the territory of the Republic of China (Taiwan). The islands are the key transportation hub between Mawei and Shanghai, and are of strategic importance in the Taiwan Strait area.

The Sishuang islands in Haidao Township, Xiapu County, Ningde, Fujian, China (PRC) are north-northwest of the township.

The deepest point in the waters around the Matsu Islands is off the coast of Dongyin. After passing Liang Island (also referred as Wave Islet), ships riding from Nangan encounter stronger waves, which explains why Dongyin was originally called Tungyung (Dongyong). The waters around Dongyin host large schools of fish, and coral reefs, which makes Dongyin one of the best domestic fishing spots and the most densely populated conservation area for Larus crassirostris.

The geological formation of Dongyin is closely related to Mainland China, where the granite bedrock was formed by Yanshan Movement  dated to 100 – 200 million years ago. Thanks to its resistance to weathering, granite bedrock is seen above ground widespread in Dongyin. Although massive granite is tough, lacking internal structures, granite of poor primary permeability is easily eroded by sea water, rain, and gales, resulting in various coastal sights.

The coastal line of Dongyin is maternally related to that in Fujian, drowned valleys of Submergent Coastlines. Caps and embayments, typical coastline traits, are prevalent. Caps feature cliff erosion, including sea caves, marine arches, sea stacks, sea trenches, and abrasion platforms, while sea caves are dominant. The less prevailing sedimentary landforms are mainly seen in the inlets and are characteristic of pebble beaches.

Distinctive geological features
On account of the geological distinctiveness of Dongyin, in “Natural Landscapes and Resources Survey in the Matsu Islands”, conducted in 2000 by National Taiwan University Professor Ging-Chan Lin, twelve out of eighteen sights on the island were rated A. Among the 5 evaluation criteria, vividness, diversity, and scarcity best manifest the peculiarity of the island.

Seeing as its various and geological formations, six features of Dongyin are introduced as below.

Rocky coastlines
The bedrock of Dongyin comprises mainly gray granite, characteristic of primitiveness and assorted texture. As a consequence, odd and jagged rocks are on display.

Most of the hills on Dongyin are covered with grass,  with granite underneath. The surrounding granite cliffs are connected with sea, waves, rocks, soil, grass, and sky, creating a wide range of colors, including navy blue, white, maize, and jade. Along the sea coast of Dongyin, the serial changes of colors can be taken in at a single glance.

Suicide Cliff
This is a towering abrasion cliff, about 100 meters deep. Looking over the cliff, one is easily shocked by the impact of elevation differences. The expanding and steep terrain originated from sea gulfs is the consequence of poor primary permeability of granite and continuous erosion caused by seawater.

It is said that a woman abducted by robbers at the end of Qing Dynasty didn't surrender. She escaped to this spot and jumped off into the sea. This place is subsequently named after her. Nowadays, at Suicide Cliff, bamboo handrails and observatory are set up, followed with revitalization of old walls on which 'Righteous Virtue High up Sky, Patriotism Echo through Eternity' are inscribed to commemorate her deeds.

Rat Sands Stone Forest
Rat Sands Stone Forest is located in the coral reefs in the south of Erchong, named for its resemblance to a rat. Legend has it that the Lins in Ban Ciao became wealthy because of the good Feng Shui of their main living room facing Rat Sands.

The variations of cliff erosions on Dongyin range from natural arches, sea gulfs, sea caves, sea stacks. Among those coastal landforms. Rat Sands Stone Forest stone forest is the most famous. For a good lookout at Rat Sands, Dongyong Lighthouse and Taibai Echo Cliff are good spots. For excellent camera shots, the east of the top observatory of Yanxiu Tidal Echo (Yansiou Echoing with Tidal Cave) is the best bet.

Dragon Sea Cave
Dragon Sea Cave is situated in the south of Beiao, and at the east coastline of Wind Tiger Cape. A meters-long sea chasm and a sea arch formed on the seafront after years of erosion by strong wind and waves. Retreat of a sea cliff exposes basalt bedrock. When the sea is at peace, divisional planes and grains of basalt rock are observed. With wind and waves picking up, or during the fog season (March - May), the image of the sea arch flickers in the waves and fog, like a dragon playing in the water. Therefore, Dragon Sea Cave is nicknamed “Marine Dragon Play at Sea”.
The sleek and agile dragon is the long-eroded sea arch.

Dongao
Due to the scarcity of extensive tidal flats and sandy beaches in Dongyin, the pebble beach in Dongao is one of few ports that give access to the sea. The stairs connected to the port used to be very steep, but after renovation, they are now well established with handrails. Tourists can stay under the shade of huge stones away from blistering sun. The pebbles at the port are suitable for resting and dabbling.

Because of the constant erosion by waves, the coastal landforms demonstrate various bizarre stones. All over Dongao are sea arches, sea gulfs, cliffs, and wave-cut platforms, and so on. Over the cliff, right under your nose is the marvelous scenery, with bright blue sea in the backdrop.

Luohanping

Luohanping (Lohan Flat) is coral reefs located in the northwest of Xiyin (Siyin). 'Lohan Flat Stupid', as called by the inhabitants, is renamed Lohan Flat after the Army stationed there. 'Ping ban'(坪笨) refers to a flat stone in Fuzhou dialect, characteristic of the wave-cut platforms coexisting with sea gulfs and sea stacks. Viewed from at sea towards the coral reefs, the high sea stacks and stumps are almost lifelike 'eighteen arhats'() standing in a line, which explains how 'Arhat Stump' gets its name.

The location of the northernmost Frontier is at East Cape at Lohan Flat. Standing on the observatory, overlooking the west side, you'll be amazed with the grandiose sight of Three-colored Stone (三色石).

Government and politics

Administrative divisions
Dongyin Township is made up of two rural villages:
 Lehua Village (Foochow Romanized: Ngŏk-huà-chŏng) (name derived from '')
 Zhongliu / Jhongliou Village (name derived from '')

Mayors

Huang Hsing-Hua (黃星華) (July 16, 1956 – May 1, 1959)
Yu Te-Chu (尤德渠) (May 1, 1959 – January 1, 1962) 
Chen Shou-Wei (陳壽維) (January 1, 1962-November 1963) 
Wang Chih-Jen (王志任) (November 1963-May 1, 1970)
Lin Shou-Chi (林守基) (May 1, 1970 – October 8, 1974)
Chen An-Ko (陳安國) (October 8, 1974 – March 1, 1986)
Chen Pao-Ming (陳寶銘) (March 1, 1986 – August 31, 1993) (before his term ended, was to serve as secretary to County Magistrate Tsao Chang-Shun (曹常順); for the remaining period of his term Township Secretary Chen Duan-Tsai (陳端才) acted as mayor in his place)
Lin Jih-Fu (林日福) (March 3, 1994 – June 20, 2001) (died from disease during his term in office; Township Secretary Chen Duan-Tsai (陳端才) acted as mayor in his place)
Chen Pao-Ming (陳寶銘) (March 1, 2002 – August 13, 2005) (died suddenly from heart disease; Township Secretary Chen Duan-Tsai (陳端才) acted as mayor in his place)
Feng Yin-lo (馮印樂) (March 1, 2006 – December 24, 2014)
Yang Yun-Cheng (楊雲成) (December 25, 2014 – December 24, 2019)
Lin Te-Chien (林德建) (December 25, 2019 – present)

Military
Due to its military significance, Dongyin has been an active and heavily stationed base. As of early 2001, up to 50 Tien Chi (Sky Spear) missiles were deployed at two sites: Tungyin Island, and an unidentified second location. The Tungyin Island missiles are said to be housed in silos and protected by batteries of Tien Kung-2 SAMs. The number of soldiers, the major consumers, is several times as many as the residents.

Demographics
The inhabitants are genetically related to Changle, Fujian. Till today, Fuzhou accent and Ningde (閩東) customs are still well maintained. Among the last names of the one thousand inhabitants, the majority are Lin, Chen, and Liu.

, persons over 65 years of age made up 7.7% of the population of Dongyin Township, which was the lowest proportion of the population of any township in Taiwan (ROC).

Economy

After years of dependence on large quantities of fish as food, the fish resources have been depleted. The main source of income is from shop and store businesses. Public service sectors include one Town Hall, one police station, and one health center. In recent years, developing tourism has become a goal for the local administration and inhabitants to achieve.

Energy
The electricity for the township is supplied by the Dongyin Power Plant.

Education

The township has one elementary school and one junior high school. Therefore, most of the islanders move out from the township to pursue any education at the senior high school level or higher.

Transportation

Dongyin can be reached by ferry from Nangan or Keelung in Taiwan arriving at Zhongzhu Harbor.

Local transportation around Dongyin are taxis and scooters since the area doesn't have public buses. Dongyin can be explored by foot due to its relatively flat terrain.

Destinations

Dongyong Lighthouse

Planning for Dongyong Lighthouse began in 1902 (the 27th year of Qing dynasty Guangxu Emperor Era). In 1988, Ministry of the Interior rated it as third-class protected historical site. Towering up the sheer and precipitous cliffs, the grand white lighthouse and the blue sea are intertwined. Due to its European architecture style, Dongyong Lighthouse is also called Dongyin Villa (東引別墅). Under the lighthouse are two fog cannons, and now a newly added foghorn, a replacement for fog cannons, which all aid navigation during fog season.

Suicide Cliff
Suicide Cliff is made up of cliff erosion and sea gulfs, sitting about a hundred metres above main sea level. Downwards from the observatory, slapping waves in the deep valley are thrilling and soul-stirring.

It is said that in Qing Dynasty a fisherman's wife was kidnapped by mobsters to this island. Resisting, she escaped to this cliff, jumped off, and died. To commemorate her chastity, this cliff is named Suicide Cliff.

A Thread of Sky

Situated in the west cape of Heaven King Port in Dongyin, is a cliff erosion. Along two sides of the meandering combat trenches are bristly banners. Setting foot at the observatory after a short walk, just to see the whole sea and sky are squeezed into the perpendicular gap between the rocks. Waves rush into the narrow chasm, taking away rock little by little, creating a marvel of nature. Four inscribed words on the cliff wall, 'Sky Cleft Hark Waves' was given by General Ming-Tang Lai.

Andong Tunnel

Next to the command post is Andong Tunnel, a massive construction project with uncanny workmanship. Inside the tunnels are fully equipped with bedrooms, an ammunition depot, Zhongshan room, bathrooms and even a pigsty. Along the walls outside of the eight outlets of the tunnels is a gathering spot for Larus crassirostris, which breed every spring and summer.

Mountain Facing Guanyin
At the foot of the east hill of Mt. Enai and the west of Shaoziao, the straight up huge stone is named Mountain Facing Guanyin. From at sea, the stone looks like a cross-legged Guanyin, but it looks like a standing Guanyin facing the mountain, when seen from the mountains.

It is documented in Dongyin chronicles that when the cloud-flying Putuo Guanyin was hunting a goblin, it trailed to the island. Seeing the goblin run into the chasm and become trapped, Guanyin cast a spell and took the surrendered goblin back to the South China Sea. The statue is here for later generations to pay respect and ponder.

Dongyin Distillery
Dongyin Distillery was founded in 1961 and has been the most important business on the island. Dongyin Distillery is on the same latitude, 26 N, as another three distilleries, Mao Tai, Luzhou Tequ Liquor and Wuliangye Liquor. The indispensable conditions to produce fine liquor are optimal humidity and temperature, microorganisms for fermentation, and spring water rich in maifanite  granite.  Dongyin Distillery claims that  'Dongyong Liquor Outperforms Mao Tai'.

Yanxiu Tidal Echo
Yanxiu Tidal Echo (Yansiou Echoing with Tidal Cave) is behind the frogman troops of the special forces post. The term 'Yenshow' means “swallow nests” in Matsu dialect. Yansiou Echoing with Tidal Cave is a typical sea cove, at the bottom of which is a crevice connected to the sea. Yansiou Echoing with Tidal Cave is known to the resonant sounds caused by waves slapping against the rocks. After a stroll to the top observatory, the view expands. Towards the east is the Laoshu (Rat) Sands Stone Forest.

Beihai Tunnel
The 148-meter long Beihai Tunnel is in the west of Yansiouao in Dongyin. It used to accommodate several cutters, but was abandoned after severe damage caused by a typhoon. It was reopened to the public after restoration in 2000. Inside the tunnel is equipped with trails and railings. At the end of the tunnel, eight statues of the construction workers commemorate the restoration.

Dragon Sea Cave
Dragon Sea Cave is located in the south of Beiao and under the Dongyin gas station. After long years of erosion, exposed black basalt bedrock forms a unique 'sea arch'. When huge waves roll up, or during the fog season, the image of the sea arch flickers in the waves and fog, like a black mythical dragon playing in the water. Therefore, Dragon Sea Cave is nicknamed 'Marine Dragon Play at Sea'.

Ganen Pavilion

When the tide ebbs, the stack standing in between connects Dongyin and Xiyin (Siyin), but standing alone at sea when the tide refluxes. An embankment was built in 1986 to link Dongyin and Xiyin (Siyin). To show their gratitude for the grand construction, the troops and inhabitants on the island built a pavilion on the stack, with a sitting statue of Chiang Ching-kuo inside.

Crouching Crocodile

In the west of Qingshuiao (Cingshueiao) of Xiyin (Siyin) is Reclining Alligator Island, named after its likeness of an alligator in repose. Legend has it that a fierce alligator had caused trouble for many years at Cingshueiao. The Jade emperor recited a spell and turned it into a stone.

When it comes to a visit in Xiyin (Siyin), the best position to enjoy the sight of Reclining Alligator Island is along the high way and of the east of Cingshueiao. Towards the west, both Reclining Alligator Island and the oceanic scenery of Cingshueiao are in a full view.

Dongao

Dongao is a port located in the east of Siyin, facing Beiao of Dongyin in distance. Before the jetties were built between Dongyin and Xiyin (Siyin), Dongao was one of the important transportation hubs on Xiyin (Siyin).

Lack of vast tidal flats in Dongyin, the pebble beach in Dongao is one of few ports that give easy access to the sea. It's the best spot to enjoy the sights of coastal landforms, such as sea arches, sea gulfs, cliffs, and wave-cut platforms.

Houao
Houao (Hauao) is on the windward side against the North Wind. The hills are all covered with grass, maintaining ecological primitiveness. Representative native plant species can be found on this immense hillside, such as Lycoris radiata Herb (紅花石蒜), Lycoris sprengeri, Guizotia abyssinica, and Pittosporum, and so on. In addition, Hauao is the scenic spot where the most abundant geological features can be found in Dongyin. All different forms of cliff erosion can be easily spotted here, including sea arches, sea stacks, and sea coves.

The Northernmost Frontier
Walking towards the west from Houao (Hauao), passing a 200-meter wide concrete path, here comes the northernmost tip of the territory of R.O.C. (Taiwan), Northernmost Frontier. In 2006, it was developed into a scenic spot and a stone monument inscribed with Northernmost Frontier was erected. Since then, it has become a must-see for tourists visiting Dongyin. Out from the observatory, the north is the endless sea, and the west is the Luohanping (Lohan Flat), aka Three-Colored Stone.

Monk Reading the Scripture

Monk Reading the Scripture is at Stronghold No. 26 in Xiyin (Siyin). Facing Zhongzhu Harbor, the huge stone on the hillside stands erect, as if it were a monk, reading Tipitaka scripture, indifferent to the mundane matters. Therefore, it's called 'Monk Reading the Scripture'.

Army is still stationed at Stronghold No.26. Tourists are not allowed to enter. At dusk, looking towards the west on Dongyin, there are views of Monk Reading the Scripture in sight and rays of evening sunlight in the backdrop.

Ecology

Gulls and terns
Dongyin is located to the southwest of the Zhoushan Archipelago, one of the three world-class fisheries. The nearby water has an influx of cold and warm ocean currents, creating ideal conditions for both fish and birds: gulls and terns in particular breed on the cliffs of the islands.

Black-tailed gull (Larus crassirostris)
The black-tailed gull is about 45 cm long and is the most common in Dongyin. Nationalist soldiers stationed on the island following the end of the Chinese civil war in 1949 used the image of the bird on their badges and the Dongyin Distillery takes it as a symbol.

In the summer, black-tailed gulls number in their thousands. Most build nests on the steep cliffs at Rat Sands and outside the former artillery tunnel, Andong Tunnel. The June-to-August breeding season is a much-visited tourist attraction.

Black-naped tern (Sterna sumatrana)
The black-naped tern is the most commonly spotted summer migrant bird to the Matsu Islands. They usually rest on three uninhabited islands, Twins Reef, Sole Cap and Lotus Reef.

Bridled tern (Onychoprion anaethetus)
Bridled terns mostly roost on three uninhabited islands, Twins Reef, Sole Cap, and Lotus Reef in Xiyin (Siyin).

Plant species
In Dongyin, there are copious native plant species, in total 83 suborders 170 families and 198 species, including numerous precious ornamental and medical ones. Originally from Japan, Heteropappus ciliosus hasn't been found in Taiwan and China. Dianthus superbus var. longicalycinus is widespread in medium to high altitude areas, but is found in Donyin at an altitude less than 200 meters. Both Lycoris radiata Herb, rarely seen in Taiwan, and Lycoris sprengeri, only endemic to Dongyin among the Matsu Islands, have become important assets for tourism. Clear cutting once caused the hard-but-light slow-growing Eurya emarginata (Thunb.) Makino to near-extinction. Now it is classified as a conservation species.

Lycoris radiata
Lycoris radiata herb, within the family Amaryllidaceae, is about 30–70 cm tall, bearing a terminal of four to seven flowers. The petals are extremely wrinkled and rolled backwards. The thrums and styles are long and slender. The pollination period spans about 2 months from August to September annually. Lycoris radiata is broadly distributed on the hillsides of Mt. Shiwei, Mt. Enai in Dongyin, Dongao, Qingshuiao (Cingshueiao), and Dragon Boat Sands in Xiyin (Siyin). Flamboyant flowers are hard to miss.

In 2006, Lycoris radiata was elected by the inhabitants 'County Flower', as a replacement for bougainvillea in the martial law enforcement period.

Lycoris sprengeri
The flowers of Lycoris sprengeri, also named Matsu stone garlic, are pink with a blue tint. The leaves are 58 cm long and 1.3 cm broad. The cup-shaped flowers are elegant. The pollination period of Lycoris sprengeri is a month earlier than Lycoris radiata. In the Matsu Islands, Lycoris sprengeri occurs only in Dongyin and Xiyin (Siyin), and is already classified as a conservation species.

From June to August, dotted Lycoris sprengeri creates a picturesque landscape as swayed by the wind. Lycoris sprengeri is broadly distributed throughout Mt. Shiwei, Mt. Enai in Dongyin, Dongao(), Qingshuiao (Cingshueiao), and Dragon Boat Sands in Xiyin (Siyin).

Scilla scilloides
Scilla scilloides, within the Liliaceae, bears a terminal raceme of pink small flowers. It is said to resemble a fox's tail. The shape of Scilla scilloides is elegant. In Northern Taiwan, Scilla scilloides occupies habitats under 700 meters high in a small amount. From July to August, Scilla scilloides can be easily spotted on the open hillsides or fields along the roads in Dongyin and Xiyin (Siyin).

Scilla scilloides also can be found in Nangan (Matsu Island), but the majority is in Dongyin and Xiyin (Siyin). NTU Professor suggests Scilla scilloides be a listed candidate for 'Township Flower' in Dongyin.

Dianthus superbus var. longicalycinus
Dianthus superbus var. longicalycinus, within family Caryophyllaceae (石竹科), simply looks like wild Dianthus (石竹). Dianthus can be recognized by their rather ragged edges of petals and long calyxes connected to petals. Most flowers are pink and blue. The huge amount of Dianthus gives an impression of the endemic plant in the Matsu Islands. However, Dianthus, though not common, can also be found in Taiwan.

The pollination period of Dianthus is long, from early summer to winter. The blossom period lasts for half a year. They grow in a large quantity in the wild and along the roadsides in Dongyin. Dianthus is also to be found.

Heteropappus ciliosus
Heteropappus ciliosus has not been found in Taiwan. Due to the special geography of Dongyin in proximity to the Mainland China, Heteropappus ciliosus is one of the valuable assets. Heteropappus ciliosus grows snugly close to the ground. The colors of the tongue-shaped flowers are violet, pink and white, with yellow tube-shaped bulb in the middle, while the violet and pink ones are more commonly seen.

The annual blossom season of Heteropappus ciliosus is when the terns emigrate at the end of summer. The eye-catching violet Heteropappus ciliosus enriches the wild. Heteropappus ciliosus is widely distributed at Dongyong Lighthouse, Suicide Cliff and Houao.

Eurya emarginata (Thunb.) Makino
Eurya emarginata (Thunb.) Makino, scientific name Eurya japonica Thunb., is also nicknamed 'Matsu purple sandalwood'. Eurya is an evergreen species, resistant to cold and salt. As the dominant plant, slow growing Eurya is primarily distributed on the barren slopes of coastal cliffs. The surface of the leaves is smooth and hard, with serrated edges.

Eurya (濱柃木) is adapted to the fierce northeast monsoon, demonstrating elegant tree formations. In the past, local soldiers and inhabitants often used Eurya for wands or chops on account of its light and hard texture. At some point, Eurya was threatened with disappearance. Thanks to the reevaluation and attention from the researchers and local government, Eurya is now classified as a conservation species. While visiting Yanxiu Tidal Echo (Yansiou Echoing with Tidal Cave), tourists can spot the unbending and graceful Eurya.

Gallery

See also
 Zhongliu Tianhou Temple
 List of islands of the Republic of China
 List of Taiwanese superlatives
 List of islands in the East China Sea
 Baselines of the Chinese territorial sea

References

External links

我們的島 第259集 東引之光 (2004-06-21) ('Our Island No. 259: Glistening Dongyin')